Big Fall Creek Lake is an alpine lake in Custer County, Idaho, United States, located in the Boulder Mountains in Salmon-Challis National Forest. The lake is most easily accessed via forest road 168.

References

`

Lakes of Idaho
Lakes of Custer County, Idaho
Salmon-Challis National Forest